Ma Xinyi (Xiao'erjing: , ; Styled and variably 穀三; Posthumous title: 端敏公 (Duke Duanmin); November 3, 1821–August 23, 1870) was an eminent Hui Muslim official and a military general of the late Qing Dynasty in China.

Along with other prominent figures, including Hu Linyi and Guam Wing, Ma raised the Green Standard Army to fight against the Taiping Rebellion and restore the stability of Qing Dynasty. This set the scene for the era later known as the "Tongzhi Restoration". His assassination symbolized the serious conflict  between the Xiang Army and Green Standard Army, both of which fought for the Qing Dynasty.

Early life
Born as a native of Heze, Shandong in 1821, he had successfully passed the imperial examinations at the age of 26 (1847), a prestigious achievement in China. He earned the Jinshi degree, the highest level in the civil service examinations, which led to his appointment to the Hanlin Academy, a body of outstanding Chinese literary scholars who performed literary tasks for the imperial court.

Assassination
Ma Xinyi was later appointed as the governor-general of Liangjiang, a region comprising the provinces of Jiangxi, Anhui and Jiangsu in 1868. He proved to be an able administrator, distinguishing himself with his capability to manage tensions with foreigners. This was demonstrated when Ma Xinyi addressed the problem of kidnapping in his area, which effectively averted anti-foreign riots, particularly in the area of the Yangzi delta.

Two years later, in 1870, Ma Xinyi was assassinated and his killer was immediately caught. The assassin was identified as Wan Qingxuan (Zhang Wenxiang), who was executed in the marketplace after a trial presided by Wan Qingxuan of Nanchang. Some sources state that he was the governor's former companion. Many historical rumours implicated the Empress Dowager Cixi in Ma Xinyi's death. This is aligned with the speculation that Ma Xinyi's assassination was due to the conflict between the imperial army and the Xiang militia, the group that played an important role in the suppression of the Taiping Rebellion.

References

 
Porter, Jonathan. Tseng Kuo-Fan's Private Bureaucracy. Berkeley: University of California, 1972.
Wright, Mary Clabaugh. The Last Stand of Chinese Conservatism: The T'ung-Chih Restoration, 1862 -1874. Stanford, CA: Stanford University Press, 1957.

1821 births
1870 deaths
19th-century Chinese people
Assassinated Chinese politicians
Chinese Muslims
Generals from Shandong
Hui people
Members of the Green Standard Army
People murdered in China
Political office-holders in Jiangsu
Politicians from Heze
Qing dynasty generals
Qing dynasty politicians from Shandong
Viceroys of Liangjiang
Viceroys of Min-Zhe